Spanglish (a portmanteau of the words "Spanish" and "English") is any language variety (such as a contact dialect, hybrid language, pidgin, or creole language) that results from conversationally combining Spanish and English. The term is mostly used in the United States and refers to a blend of the words and grammar of the two languages. More narrowly, Spanglish can specifically mean a variety of Spanish with heavy use of English loanwords. 

Since different Spanglish arises independently in different regions of varying degrees of bilingualism, it reflects the locally spoken varieties of English and Spanish. Different forms of Spanglish are not necessarily mutually intelligible.

The term Spanglish is first recorded in 1933. It corresponds to the Spanish terms Espanglish (from Español + English, introduced by the Puerto Rican poet Salvador Tió in the late 1940s), Ingléspañol (from Inglés +  Español), and Inglañol (Inglés + Español). Other colloquial portmanteau words for Spanglish are Spenglish (recorded from 1967) and Spinglish (from 1970). In Mexican and Chicano Spanish the common term for "Spanglish" is "Pocho".

Definitions
There is no single, universal definition of Spanglish. The term Spanglish has been used in reference to the following phenomena, all of which are distinct from each other: 

 The use of integrated English loanwords in Spanish
 Nonassimilated Anglicisms (i.e., with English phonetics) in Spanish
 Calques and loan translations from English
 Code switching, particularly intra-sentential (i.e., within the same clause) switches
 Grammar mistakes in Spanish found among transitional bilingual speakers 
 Second-language Spanish, including poor translations.
 Mock Spanish

History and distribution
In the late 1940s, the Puerto Rican journalist, poet, and essayist Salvador Tió coined the terms Espanglish for Spanish spoken with some English terms, and the less commonly used Inglañol for English spoken with some Spanish terms.

After Puerto Rico became a United States territory in 1898, Spanglish became progressively more common there as the United States Army and the early colonial administration tried to impose the English language on island residents. Between 1902 and 1948, the main language of instruction in public schools (used for all subjects except for Spanish class) was English. Currently Puerto Rico is nearly unique in having both English and Spanish as its official languages (see also New Mexico). Consequently, many American English words are now found in the vocabulary of Puerto Rican Spanish. Spanglish may also be known by different regional names.

Spanglish does not have one unified dialect—specifically, the varieties of Spanglish spoken in New York, Florida, Texas, and California differ. Monolingual speakers of standard Spanish may have difficulty in understanding it.
It is common in Panama, where the 96-year (1903–1999) U.S. control of the Panama Canal influenced much of local society, especially among the former residents of the Panama Canal Zone, the Zonians.

Many Puerto Ricans living on the island of St. Croix speak in informal situations a unique Spanglish-like combination of Puerto Rican Spanish and the local Crucian dialect of Virgin Islands Creole English, which is very different from the Spanglish spoken elsewhere. A similar situation exists in the large Puerto Rican-descended populations of New York City and Boston.

Spanglish is spoken commonly in the modern United States, reflecting the growth of the Hispanic-American population due to immigration. According to the U.S. Census Bureau, the population of Hispanics grew from 35.3 million to 53 million between 2000 and 2012. Hispanics have become the largest minority ethnic group in the US.  More than 60% are of Mexican descent. Mexican Americans form one of the fastest-growing groups, increasing from 20.6 million to 34.5 million between 2000 and 2012. Around 58% of this community chose California, especially Southern California, as their new home. Spanglish is widely used throughout the heavily Mexican-American and other Hispanic communities of Southern California.
The use of Spanglish has become important to Hispanic communities throughout the United States in areas such as Miami, New York City, Texas, and California. In Miami, the Afro-Cuban community makes use of a Spanglish familiarly known as "Cubonics," a portmanteau of the words Cuban and Ebonics, a slang term for African American Vernacular English that is itself a portmanteau of Ebony and phonics."

Spanglish is known as bilingualism/semi-lingualism. The acquisition of the first language is interrupted or unstructured language input follows from the second language. This can also happen in reverse.

Many Mexican-Americans (Chicanos), immigrants and bilinguals express themselves in various forms of Spanglish. For many, Spanglish serves as a basis for self-identity, but others believe that it should not exist.
Spanglish is difficult, because if the speaker learned the two languages in separate contexts, they use the conditioned system, in which the referential meanings in the two languages differ considerably. Those who were literate in their first language before learning the other, and who have support to maintain that literacy, are sometimes those least able to master their second language. Spanglish is part of receptive bilingualism. Receptive bilinguals are those who understand a second language but don't speak it. That is when they use Spanglish. Receptive bilinguals are also known as productively bilingual, since, to give an answer, the speaker exerts much more mental effort to answer in English, Spanish, or Spanglish. Without first understanding the culture and history of the region where Spanglish evolved as a practical matter an in depth familiarizing with multiple cultures. This knowledge, indeed the mere fact of one's having that knowledge, often forms an important part of both what one considers one's personal identity and what others consider one's identity.

Other places where similar mixed codes are spoken are Gibraltar (Llanito), Belize (Kitchen Spanish), Aruba, Bonaire, and Curaçao (along with Dutch and Papiamento). 

Spanglish is also spoken among the Spanish-speaking community in Australia.  It is common to hear expressions among Spanish-speaking minorities in cities like Sydney and Melbourne, like: vivo en un flat pequeño; voy a correr con mis runners; la librería de la city es grande, or words such as el rubbish bin, la vacuum cleaner, el tram, el toilet or el mobile. The same situation happens within the Spanish-speaking community of New Zealand.

Usage

Spanglish patterns
Spanglish is informal, although speakers can consistently judge the grammaticality of a phrase or sentence. From a linguistic point of view, Spanglish often is mistakenly labeled many things. Spanglish is not a creole or dialect of Spanish because, though people claim they are native Spanglish speakers, Spanglish itself is not a language on its own, but speakers speak English or Spanish with a heavy influence from the other language. The definition of Spanglish has been unclearly explained by scholars and linguists despite being noted so often. Spanglish is the fluid exchange of language between English and Spanish, present in the heavy influence in the words and phrases used by the speaker.
Spanglish is currently considered a hybrid language practice by linguists–many actually refer to Spanglish as "Spanish-English code-switching", though there is some influence of borrowing, and lexical and grammatical shifts as well.

The inception of Spanglish is due to the influx of native Spanish speaking Latin American people into North America, specifically the United States of America. As mentioned previously, the phenomenon of Spanglish can be separated into two different categories: code switching, and borrowing, lexical and grammatical shifts. Codeswitching has sparked controversy because it is seen "as a corruption of Spanish and English, a 'linguistic pollution' or 'the language of a "raced", underclass people'". For example, a fluent bilingual speaker addressing another bilingual speaker might engage in code switching with the sentence, "I'm sorry I cannot attend next week's meeting porque tengo una obligación de negocios en Boston, pero espero que I'll be back for the meeting the week after"—which means, "I'm sorry I cannot attend next week's meeting because I have a business obligation in Boston, but I hope to be back for the meeting the week after".

Calques
Calques are translations of entire words or phrases from one language into another. They represent the simplest forms of Spanglish, as they undergo no lexical or grammatical structural change. The use of calques is common throughout most languages, evident in the calques of Arabic exclamations used in Spanish.

Examples:
 "to call back"  →  (llamar pa' atrás, llamar para atrás)
 "It's up to you." →  (Está pa' arriba de ti, Está para arriba de ti) ( (You decide))
 "to be up to ..." →  (estar pa' arriba de ..., estar para arriba de ...) (depender de ... or X decida (X decides))
 "to run for governor" → 

Here,  reflects the particle back in various English phrasal verbs.
Meanwhile, they're unattested in
non-contact varieties of Spanish.
 expressions are unique as a calque of an English verbal particle, since other phrasal verbs and particles are almost never calqued into Spanish.
Because of this, and because they're consistent with existing Spanish grammar,  argues they are likely a result of a conceptual, not linguistic loan.
That is, the notion of "backness" has been expanded in these contact varieties.

Semantic extensions
Semantic extension or reassignment refers to a phenomenon where speakers use a word of language A (typically Spanish in this case) with the meaning of its cognate in language B (typically English), rather than its standard meaning in language A. In Spanglish this usually occurs in the case of "false friends" (similar to, but technically not the same as false cognates), where words of similar form in Spanish and English are thought to have like meanings based on their cognate relationship.

Examples:

An example of this lexical phenomenon in Spanglish is the emergence of new verbs when the productive Spanish verb-making suffix -ear is attached to an English verb. For example, the Spanish verb for "to eat lunch" (almorzar in standard Spanish) becomes lonchear (occasionally lunchear). The same process produces watchear,  parquear, emailear, twittear, etc.

Loan words
Loan words occur in any language due to the presence of items or ideas not present in the culture before, such as modern technology. The increasing rate of technological growth requires the use of loan words from the donor language due to the lack of its definition in the lexicon of the main language. This partially deals with the "prestige" of the donor language, which either forms a dissimilar or more similar word from the loan word. The growth of modern technology can be seen in the expressions: "hacer click" (to click), "mandar un e-mail" (to send an e-mail), "faxear" (to fax), "textear" (to text-message), or "hackear" (to hack).  Some words borrowed from the donor languages are adapted to the language, while others remain unassimilated (e. g. "sandwich", "jeans" or "laptop"). The items most associated with Spanglish refer to words assimilated into the main morphology. Borrowing words from English and "Spanishizing" them has typically occurred through immigrants. This method makes new words by pronouncing an English word "Spanish style", thus dropping final consonants, softening others, and replacing certain consonants (e.g. V's with B's and M's with N's).

Examples: 
"Aseguranza" (insurance)
"Biles" (bills)
"Chorcha" (church)
"Ganga" (gang)
"Líder" (leader) – considered an established Anglicism 
"Lonchear/Lonchar" (to have lunch)
"Marqueta" (market)
"Taipear/Tipear" (to type)
"Troca" (truck) – Widely used in most of northern Mexico as well
”Mitin” (meeting) – An outdoors gathering of people mostly for political purposes.
”Checar” (to check)
”Escanear” (to scan) – To digitalize (e.g. a document).
”Chatear” (to chat) 
“Desorden” (disorder) – incorrectly used as “disease”.
”Condición” (condition) – incorrectly used as “sickness”.

So-insertion
Within the US, the English word so is often inserted into Spanish discourse. This use of so is found in conversations that otherwise take place entirely in Spanish. Its users run the gamut from Spanish-dominant immigrants to native, balanced bilinguals to English-dominant semi-speakers and second-language speakers of Spanish, and even people who reject the use of Anglicisms have been found using so in Spanish.
Whether so is a simple loanword, or part of some deeper form of language mixing, is disputed. Many consider so to simply be a loanword, although borrowing short function words is quite abnormal.
This is unusual, since code-switched or lexically inserted words typically aren't as common and recurring as so is.

So is always used as a coordinating conjunction in Spanish. It can be used phrase-internally, or at the beginning or end of a sentence. In Spanish discourse, so is never used to mean "in order that" as it often is in English. As a sociolinguistic phenomenon, speakers who subconsciously insert so into their Spanish usually spend most of their time speaking English. This and other facts suggest that the insertion of so and similar items such as you know and I mean are the result of a kind of "metalinguistic bracketing". That is, discourse in Spanish is circumscribed by English and by a small group of English functional words. These terms can act as punctuation for Spanish dialogue within an English-dominant environment.

Fromlostiano 

Fromlostiano is a type of artificial and humorous wordplay that translates Spanish idioms word-for-word into English. The name fromlostiano comes from the expression From Lost to the River, which is a word-for-word translation of de perdidos al río; an idiom that means that one is prone to choose a particularly risky action in a desperate situation (this is somewhat comparable to the English idiom in for a penny, in for a pound). 
The humor comes from the fact that while the expression is completely grammatical in English, it makes no sense to a native English speaker. Hence it is necessary to understand both languages to appreciate the humor.

This phenomenon was first noted in the book From Lost to the River in 1995. The book describes six types of fromlostiano:
 Translations of Spanish idioms into English: With you bread and onion (Contigo pan y cebolla), Nobody gave you a candle in this burial (Nadie te ha dado vela en este entierro), To good hours, green sleeves (A buenas horas mangas verdes).
 Translations of American and British celebrities' names into Spanish: Vanesa Tumbarroja (Vanessa Redgrave).
 Translations of American and British street names into Spanish: Calle del Panadero (Baker Street).
 Translations of Spanish street names into English: Shell Thorn Street (Calle de Concha Espina).
 Translations of multinational corporations' names into Spanish: Ordenadores Manzana (Apple Computers).
 Translations of Spanish minced oaths into English: Tu-tut that I saw you (Tararí que te vi).
The use of Spanglish has evolved over time. It has emerged as a way of conceptualizing one's thoughts whether it be in speech or on paper.

Identity
The use of Spanglish is often associated with the speaker's  expression of identity (in terms of language learning) and reflects how many minority-American cultures feel toward their heritage. Commonly in ethnic communities within the United States, the knowledge of one's heritage language tends to assumably signify if one is truly of a member of their culture. Just as Spanish helps individuals identify with their Spanish identity,  Individuals of Hispanic descent living in America face living in two very different worlds and  "This synergy of cultures and struggle with identity is reflected in language use and results in the mixing of Spanish and English." Spanglish is used to facilitate communication with others in both worlds. While some individuals  believe that Spanglish should not be considered a language, it is a language that has evolved and is continuing to grow and affect the way new generations are educated, culture change, and the production of media. Living within the United States creates a synergy of culture and struggles for many Mexican-Americans. The hope to retain their cultural heritage/language and their dual-identity in American society is one of the major factors that lead to the creation of Spanglish.

Arts and culture

Literature 
There is a vast body of Latino literature in the United States that features dialogue and descriptions in Spanglish, especially in Chicano, Nuyorican, and Puerto Rican literature. Books that feature Spanglish in a significant way include the following.
 Giannina Braschi's Yo-Yo Boing! (1998) is the first Spanglish novel.
Guillermo Gómez-Peña uses Spanglish in his performances.
Matt de la Peña's novel Mexican WhiteBoy (2008) features flourishes of Spanglish.
Junot Díaz's The Brief Wondrous Life of Oscar Wao also uses Spanglish words and phrases.
 Pedro Pietri wrote the poem El Spanglish National Anthem. (1993)
Ilan Stavans Spanglish: The Making of a New American Language. (2004)
Piri Thomas wrote the autobiography Down These Mean Streets (1967) using Spanglish phrases.
Yoss' science fiction novel Super Extra Grande (2009) is set in a future where Latin Americans have colonized the galaxy and Spanglish is the lingua franca among the galaxy's sentient species.
H. G. Wells's future history The Shape of Things to Come (1933) predicted that in the 21st century English and Spanish would "become interchangeable languages".
Germán Valdés, a Mexican comedian, (known as Tin Tan) made heavy use of Spanglish. He dressed as a pachuco.

Music

Overview 
The use of Spanglish by incorporating English and Spanish lyrics into music has risen in the United States over time. In the 1980s 1.2% of songs in the Billboard Top 100 contained Spanglish lyrics, eventually growing to 6.2% in the 2000s. The lyrical emergence of Spanglish by way of Latin American musicians has grown tremendously, reflective of the growing Hispanic population within the United States.
 Mexican rock band Molotov, whose members use Spanglish in their lyrics.
 American progressive rock band The Mars Volta, whose song lyrics frequently switch back and forth between English and Spanish.
 Ska punk pioneers Sublime, whose singer Bradley Nowell grew up in a Spanish-speaking community, released several songs in Spanglish.
 American nu metal band Ill Niño frequently mix Spanish and English lyrics in their songs.
 Shakira (born Shakira Isabel Mebarak Ripoll), a Colombian singer-songwriter, musician and model.
 Sean Paul (born Sean Paul Ryan Francis Henriques), a Jamaican singer and songwriter.
 Ricky Martin (born Enrique Martín Morales), a Puerto Rican pop musician, actor and author.
 Pitbull (born Armando Christian Pérez), a successful Cuban-American rapper, producer and Latin Grammy Award-winning artist from Miami, Florida that has brought Spanglish into mainstream music through his multiple hit songs.
 Enrique Iglesias, a Spanish singer-songwriter with songs in English, Spanish and Spanglish; Spanglish songs include Bailamos and Bailando.
 Rapper Silento, famous for his song "Watch Me (Whip/Nae Nae)", recorded a version in Spanglish

History 
The rise of Spanglish in music within the United States also creates new classifications of Latin(o) music, as well as the wider Latin(o) music genre. In some growing music scenes, it is noted that for artists go beyond music and bring in political inclinations as a way to make wider commentary. Although Los Angeles Chicano bands from the 1960s and 1970s are often remembered as part of the Chicano-movement as agents for social chance, Latin(o) music has long been a way for artists to exercise political agency, including the post-World War II jazz scene, the New York City salsa of the 1970s, and the hip-hop movement of the 80s. Some of the topics addressed in these movements include: redlining and housing policies; immigration; discrimination; and transnationalism.

Commercialization 
Over time, however, this more explicit show of political nature might have been lessened due to the desire to compete in the music business of the English speaking world. This however, did not stop the a change in U.S. music, where English-speaking musicians have moved towards collaborative music, and bilingual duets are growing in popularity, indicating an audience demand for multi-language entertainment, as well as a space for traditional Latino artists to enter the mainstream and find chart success beyond the Spanish-speaking world. This is despite the slower-growing opportunities for Latino musicians to occupy higher-up positions such as promoters, business owners, and producers.

Present-day 
With this growing demand for Spanglish duets, there has also been a rise in indie Latino artists who incorporate Spanglish lyrics in their music. One such artist is Omar Apollo, who combines Spanglish lyrics with music influenced by traditional corridos. Other up and coming Latino artists, such as Kali Uchis, Empress Of, and Ambar Lucid, have also led to a greater prominence of Hispanic performers and lyricism in the contemporary top charts. These types of artists, also being second-generation Spanish speakers, suggest that there is less fear or feelings of intimidation of using Spanish in public spaces. Moreover, this lack of negative connotation with public use of Spanglish and heritage-language language tools point to a subconscious desire to challenge negative rhetoric, as well as the racism that may go along with it. Given the fact that Spanglish has been the language of communication for a growing Hispanic-American population in the United States, its growing presence in Latino music is considered, by some scholars, a persistent and easily identifiable marker of an increasingly intersectional Latino identity.

See also 
 American literature in Spanish
Nuyorican
 Caló (Chicano) a Mexican-American argot, similar to Spanglish
 Chicano English
 Code-switching
 Dog Latin
 Dunglish
 Franglais
 Hispanicisms in English
 Languages in the United States
 List of English words of Spanish origin
 Llanito (an Andalusian vernacular unique to Gibraltar)
 Portuñol, the unsystematic mixture of Portuguese with Spanish
 Spanish language in the United States
 Spanish dialects and varieties

Categories
 :Category:Forms of English
 :Category:Spanglish songs

Notes

References

Aldama, Frederick Luis (2020), Poets, Philosophers, Lovers: On the Writings of Giannina Braschi. U Pittsburgh, 2020.
Betti, Silvia. "La imagen de los hispanos en la publicidad de los Estados Unidos", Informes del Observatorio, 2015. 009-03/2015SP
Silvia Betti y Daniel Jorques, eds. Visiones europeas del spanglish, Valencia, Uno y Cero, 2015.
Silvia Betti: "La definición del Spanglish en la última edición del Diccionario de la Real Academia (2014)", Revista GLOSAS (de la ANLE), 2015.
Betti, Silvia y Enric Serra Alegre, eds. Una investigación polifónica. Nuevas voces sobre el spanglish, New York, Valencia, Academia Norteamericana de la Lengua Española (ANLE) y Universitat de València-Estudi General (UVEG), 2016.

 Guzman, B. "The Hispanic Population." US Census 22.2 (2000): 1. US Census Bureau. Web.
 
 

 

 

 United States Census Bureau. Hispanic Origin. US Census Bureau, n.d. Web. August 11, 2014.

External links

 Current TV video "Nuyorican Power " on Spanglish as the Nuyorican language; featuring Daddy Yankee, Giannina Braschi, Rita Moreno, and other Nuyorican icons.
 Spanglish – the Language of Chicanos , University of California
 What is Spanglish? Texas State University

Macaronic forms of English
Spanish language in the United States
1940s neologisms
Code-switching